Qingyuan Manchu Autonomous County (Mölendroff: cingyuwan manju beye dasangga siyan), or simply Qingyuan County is one of the three counties under the administration of the prefecture-level city of Fushun, in the east of Liaoning, People's Republic of China, and is also one of the 11 Manchu autonomous counties and one of 117 autonomous counties nationally.

Administrative divisions
There are 18 towns and seven townships in the county.

Towns:
Qingyuan, Dagujia, Hongtoushan, Ying'emen, Nanshancheng, Nankouqian, Caoshi, Xiajiabao, Wandianzi

Townships:
Tukouzi Township, Beisanjia Township, Aojiabao Township, Dasuhe Township, Gounai Township

Geography and climate
Qingyuan is located in the north of Fushun City. It spans 41°48′−42°29′ N latitude and 124°20′−125°29′ E longitude. Bordering county-level divisions are as follows:

In Liaoning:
Xinbin Manchu Autonomous Countysouth
Fushun Countywest
Tieling Countywest
Xifeng Countynorth
Kaiyuannorth

In Jilin:
 Dongfeng Countyeast
 Meihekoueast
 Liuhe Countyeast

Qingyuan has a monsoon-influenced humid continental climate (Köppen Dwa), characterised by hot, humid summers and long, cold and windy, but dry winters. The four seasons here are distinctive. Over 60% of the annual rainfall of  occurs from June to August alone. In winter, due to the elevation and normally dry climate, diurnal temperature variation regularly exceeds .

References

External links

Fushun
County-level divisions of Liaoning
Manchu autonomous counties